Chlidonophoridae is a family of brachiopods belonging to the order Terebratulida.

Existence 
Fossils of Chlidonophoridae have been discovered as early as 191-183 MYA in the Jurassic period.  her has a total of 52 species out of which 25 are extant to the present day (48%). There have been a total of 697 occurrences of the genus, most located in the Gulf of Mexico, North coast of Europe, West of Australia, East of Africa and South of South America.

Charactersistics 
All species of Chlidonophoridae are blind like all species of Rhynchonellata. They are stationary and are attached to a surface. They are suspension feeders also called filter feeders and their diet consists of suspended food particles like phytoplankton. They also have a taphonomy of low Mg calcite like all other brachiopods.

Subtaxa

Subfamily Chlidonophorinae 

 Chlidonophora
 Deslongchampsithyris 
 Disculina 
 Gisilina 
 Meonia 
 Prochlidonophora 
 Rugia

Subfamily Draciinae 

 Dracius

Subfamily Eucalathinae 

 Eucalathus
 Notozyga

Subfamily Orthothyridinae 

 Orthothyris

Subfamily Agulhasiinae 

 Agulhasia

References

Terebratulida